Thein Nyunt was one of six ministers of the President's Office, in the Cabinet of Burma (Myanmar), as well as the Mayor and the Chairman of the Naypyidaw Council, which governs the national capital. He served for State Peace and Development Council as the Minister of Progress of Border Areas, National Races and Development Affairs. Thein Nyunt was appointed interim mayor of Naypyidaw, the national capital of Myanmar on 1 March 2006 and subsequently became the Chairman of the Naypyidaw Council. He is a retired army colonel.

References 

Living people
Government ministers of Myanmar
1948 births
People from Ayeyarwady Region
Union Solidarity and Development Party politicians